Penion chathamensis is a species of very large predatory sea snail or whelk, a marine gastropod mollusc in the family Buccinidae, the true whelks.

Description
Penion chathamensis is a very large species of Penion siphon whelk. Although P. chathamensis has separate sexes, the species does not appear to exhibit secondary sexual dimorphism in shell shape or size.

A separate species, Penion fairfieldae was formerly recognised, but recent genetic data has demonstrated that the species is indistinguishable from Penion chathamensis. Shells originally recognised as P. fairfieldae can be distinguished from P. chathamensis using shell size, but not using shell shape.

Distribution
Penion chathamensis is endemic to New Zealand. The species is distributed off of the west coast of the South Island, and occurs on Chatham Rise and in waters surrounding the Chatham Islands The latter location is the type locality, giving rise to the binomial name of the species.

References

External links
 Museum of New Zealand Te Papa Tongarewa, Taxon: Penion chathamensis Powell, 1938 (Species)
 Auckland War Memorial Museum: Penion chathamensis
 New Zealand Mollusca - Penion chathamensis (Powell, 1938)
 Natural History Museum Rotterdam - Mollusca - Gastropoda - Buccinidae

Buccinidae
Gastropods of New Zealand
Gastropods described in 1938